Old Supreme Court Building may refer to:

 Old Supreme Court Building, Hong Kong, the home of the Court of Final Appeal of Hong Kong. 
 Old Supreme Court Building, Singapore, the former home of the Supreme Court of Singapore